Ennis Independent School District is a public school district based in Ennis, Texas, United States.

In addition to Ennis, the district serves the towns of Alma, Bardwell, and Garrett in southeastern Ellis County. A portion of the district extends into northern Navarro County.

They were Texas football state champions in 1975, 2000, 2001, 2004 and 2014.
In 2009, the school district was rated "academically acceptable" by the Texas Education Agency.

Schools
 Ennis High School (grades 9–12)
 Ennis Junior High School (grades 7–8)
 Sam Houston Elementary (grades 1–3)
 Stephen F. Austin Elementary (grades 1–3)
 James Bowie Elementary (grades 1–3)
 William B. Travis Elementary (grades 1–3)
 David Crockett Early Childhood Center (grades PK–K)
 George W. Carver Early Childhood Center (grades PK–K)
 Jack Lummus Intermediate School (grades 4–6)
 Dorie Miller Intermediate School (grades 4–6) - [Former Sixth Grade Center grade 6]
 Alamo Education Center (alternative learning programs) - [Former High School]

The district also owns Lion Memorial Stadium, which is to the east of Ennis High School. It is a 10,000-capacity stadium which was completed in 2001, and is the home of the Ennis Lions.

References

External links
 Ennis ISD

School districts in Ellis County, Texas
School districts in Navarro County, Texas
School districts established in 1881